Cumberland Avenue station may refer to:
 Cumberland Avenue station (Tampa), a streetcar station
 Cumberland Avenue station (BMT Fulton Street Line), a demolished elevated station in New York City